Yassıhüyük is a village in the District of Polatlı of Ankara Province, Turkey.

References

Villages in Polatlı District
Phrygia